In geometry, an Hadamard space, named after Jacques Hadamard, is a non-linear generalization of a Hilbert space. In the literature they are also equivalently defined as complete CAT(0) spaces.

A Hadamard space is defined to be a nonempty complete metric space such that, given any points  and  there exists a point  such that for every point 

In a Hilbert space, the above inequality is equality (with ), and in general an Hadamard space is said to be  if the above inequality is equality. A flat Hadamard space is isomorphic to a closed convex subset of a Hilbert space. In particular, a normed space is an Hadamard space if and only if it is a Hilbert space.

The geometry of Hadamard spaces resembles that of Hilbert spaces, making it a natural setting for the study of rigidity theorems. In a Hadamard space, any two points can be joined by a unique geodesic between them; in particular, it is contractible. Quite generally, if  is a bounded subset of a metric space, then the center of the closed ball of the minimum radius containing it is called the circumcenter of  Every bounded subset of a Hadamard space is contained in the smallest closed ball (which is the same as the closure of its convex hull).

The basic result for a non-positively curved manifold is the Cartan–Hadamard theorem. The analog holds for a Hadamard space: a complete, connected metric space which is locally isometric to a Hadamard space has an Hadamard space as its universal cover. Its variant applies for non-positively curved orbifolds. (cf. Lurie.)

Important examples of Hadamard manifolds are simply connected nonpositively curved symmetric spaces.

Applications of Hadamard spaces are not restricted to geometry. In 1998, Dmitri Burago and Serge Ferleger used CAT(0) geometry to solve a problem in dynamical billiards: in a gas of hard balls, is there a uniform bound on the number of collisions? The solution begins by constructing a configuration space for the dynamical system, obtained by joining together copies of corresponding billiard table, which turns out to be an Hadamard space.

See also

References

 
 
 Burago, Dmitri; Yuri Burago, and Sergei Ivanov. A Course in Metric Geometry. American Mathematical Society. (1984)
 Jacob Lurie: Notes on the Theory of Hadamard Spaces
 Alexander S., Kapovich V., Petrunin A. Notes on Alexandrov Geometry

Functional analysis
Geometric topology
Hilbert space
Metric spaces